

16001–16100 

|-id=002
| 16002 Bertin ||  || Emmanuel Bertin (born 1973), French astronomer || 
|-id=007
| 16007 Kaasalainen ||  || Mikko Kaasalainen (born 1965), Finnish astronomer and expert in orbital dynamics and lightcurve-inversion to reconstruct the shapes of minor planets || 
|-id=012
| 16012 Jamierubin ||  || Jamie Elyce Rubin, 2003 Intel STS finalist || 
|-id=013
| 16013 Schmidgall ||  || Emma Rose Schmidgall, 2003 Intel STS finalist || 
|-id=014
| 16014 Sinha ||  || Naveen Neil Sinha, 2003 Intel STS finalist || 
|-id=015
| 16015 Snell ||  || Sabrina Curie Snell, 2003 Intel STS finalist and USNO SEAP intern || 
|-id=017
| 16017 Street ||  || Ethan James Street, 2003 Intel STS finalist || 
|-id=019
| 16019 Edwardsu ||  || Edward Joseph Su, 2003 Intel STS finalist || 
|-id=020
| 16020 Tevelde ||  || Vera Louise te Velde, 2003 Intel STS finalist || 
|-id=021
| 16021 Caseyvaughn ||  || Casey Ann Vaughn, 2003 Intel STS finalist || 
|-id=022
| 16022 Wissnergross ||  || Zachary Daniel Wissner-Gross, 2003 Intel STS finalist || 
|-id=023
| 16023 Alisonyee ||  || Alison Kimberly Yee, 2003 Intel STS finalist || 
|-id=026
| 16026 Victoriapidgeon ||  || Victoria Pidgeon Andrews (born 1956) did outstanding work for the NASA Planetary Defense Coordination Office. She guided the efforts of the US Government Interagency Working Group to develop the National Near Earth Object Preparedness Strategy and Action Plan to its publication on 2018 June 20. || 
|-id=035
| 16035 Sasandford ||  || Scott A. Sandford (born 1957), American astronomer || 
|-id=036
| 16036 Moroz ||  || Vassili I. Moroz (1931–2004), Russian planetary scientist and astronomer || 
|-id=037
| 16037 Sheehan ||  || William Sheehan (born 1954), American psychiatrist, author, and amateur astronomer † || 
|-id=039
| 16039 Zeglin ||  || Scott Bailey Zeglin, 2003 Intel STS finalist || 
|-id=043
| 16043 Yichenzhang ||  || Yi-Chen Zhang, 2003 Intel STS finalist || 
|-id=044
| 16044 Kurtbachmann ||  || Kurt Bachmann, 2003 Intel STS mentor || 
|-id=046
| 16046 Gregnorman || 1999 JK || Greg Norman (born 1956), a professional golfer from Queensland, became the world's leading player several years running and was the winner of 86 tournaments, including two British opens. Nicknamed "The Shark", he is also a keen deep-sea fisherman. || 
|-id=051
| 16051 Bernero ||  || Bruce Bernero, 2003 Intel STS mentor || 
|-id=053
| 16053 Brennan ||  || James Brennan, 2003 Intel STS mentor || 
|-id=059
| 16059 Marybuda ||  || Mary Buda, 2003 Intel STS mentor || 
|-id=062
| 16062 Buncher ||  || David Buncher, 2003 Intel STS mentor || 
|-id=064
| 16064 Davidharvey ||  || David Harvey (born 1958), a software engineer at the University of Arizona's Steward Observatory || 
|-id=065
| 16065 Borel ||  || Émile Borel (1871–1956), French mathematician || 
|-id=066
| 16066 Richardbressler ||  || Richard Main Bressler (born 1930), an American business leader and innovator, as well as a philanthropist, who has supported numerous worthy causes in science, education and the arts || 
|-id=068
| 16068 Citron ||  || Jerry Citron, 2003 Intel STS mentor || 
|-id=069
| 16069 Marshafolger ||  || Marsha Folger, 2003 Intel STS mentor || 
|-id=070
| 16070 Charops ||  || Charops was a son of Hippasus, and brother to Socus. He was wounded by Odysseus in battle and defended by his brother. || 
|-id=073
| 16073 Gaskin ||  || Regina Gaskin, 2003 Intel STS mentor || 
|-id=074
| 16074 Georgekaplan ||  || George H. Kaplan (born 1948), American astronomer at USNO || 
|-id=075
| 16075 Meglass ||  || Mary Elizabeth Glass, 2003 Intel STS mentor || 
|-id=076
| 16076 Barryhaase ||  || Barry Haase, 2003 Intel STS mentor || 
|-id=077
| 16077 Arayhamilton ||  || A. Ray Hamilton, 2003 Intel STS mentor || 
|-id=078
| 16078 Carolhersh ||  || Carol Hersh, 2003 Intel STS mentor || 
|-id=079
| 16079 Imada ||  || Keith Imada, 2003 Intel STS mentor || 
|-id=083
| 16083 Jorvik ||  || Jorvik, ninth-century Viking settlement that later became York † || 
|-id=085
| 16085 Laffan ||  || John Laffan, 2003 Intel STS mentor || 
|-id=089
| 16089 Lamb ||  || William Lamb, 2003 Intel STS mentor || 
|-id=090
| 16090 Lukaszewski ||  || Angela Lukaszewski, 2003 Intel STS mentor || 
|-id=091
| 16091 Malchiodi ||  || Beth Malchiodi, 2003 Intel STS mentor || 
|-id=094
| 16094 Scottmccord ||  || Scott McCord, 2003 Intel STS mentor || 
|-id=095
| 16095 Lorenball ||  || Loren C. Ball (born 1948), an American amateur astronomer and prolific discoverer of minor planets. Between 2000 and 2004, he discovered more than 100 asteroids from his Emerald Lane Observatory in Decatur, Alabama. Ball currently promotes asteroid education in schools and on social media. || 
|}

16101–16200 

|-
| 16101 Notskas ||  || Chrysi Notskas, 2003 Intel STS mentor || 
|-id=102
| 16102 Barshannon ||  || Barbara Shannon, 2003 Intel STS mentor || 
|-id=103
| 16103 Lorsolomon ||  || Lorraine Solomon, 2003 Intel STS mentor || 
|-id=104
| 16104 Stesullivan ||  || Stephen Sullivan, 2003 Intel STS mentor || 
|-id=105
| 16105 Marksaunders ||  || Mark Saunders (born 1942), director of the Exploration Systems and Space Operations Technology Directorate at NASA Langley Research Center † || 
|-id=106
| 16106 Carmagnola ||  || Carmagnola, Italy † || 
|-id=107
| 16107 Chanmugam ||  || Ganesar Chanmugam (1939–1996), Sri Lankan-born American astrophysicist || 
|-id=110
| 16110 Paganetti ||  || Mariarosa Paganetti, mother of Swiss discoverer Stefano Sposetti || 
|-id=111
| 16111 Donstrittmatter ||  || Donald J. Strittmatter (1935–2020) worked at Hughes Aircraft for 37 years retiring in 1994. He became President of the Tucson Amateur Astronomers in 1958 serving until 1976. In the late 1950s he was active in the Moonwatch program and known for photography of satellites and comets and teaching telescope making classes. || 
|-id=112
| 16112 Vitaris ||  || Bethany Ann Vitaris, 2001 DCYSC finalist || 
|-id=113
| 16113 Ahmed ||  || Tahir Ahmed, 2002 Intel STS finalist || 
|-id=114
| 16114 Alyono ||  || Jennifer Christy Alyono, 2002 Intel STS finalist || 
|-id=116
| 16116 Balakrishnan ||  || Jennifer Sayaka Balakrishnan, 2002 Intel STS finalist || 
|-id=118
| 16118 Therberens ||  || Theresa Joan Berens, 2002 Intel STS finalist || 
|-id=119
| 16119 Bronner ||  || Mordechai Joseph Bronner, 2002 Intel STS finalist || 
|-id=120
| 16120 Burnim ||  || Jacob Samuels Burnim, 2002 Intel STS finalist || 
|-id=121
| 16121 Burrell ||  || Marc Anthony Burrell, 2002 Intel STS finalist || 
|-id=122
| 16122 Wenyicai ||  || Wenyi Cai, 2002 Intel STS finalist || 
|-id=123
| 16123 Jessiecheng ||  || Jessie Cheng, 2002 Intel STS finalist || 
|-id=124
| 16124 Timdong ||  || Timothy Allen Dong, 2002 Intel STS finalist || 
|-id=127
| 16127 Farzan-Kashani ||  || Raphael Farzan-Kashani, 2002 Intel STS || 
|-id=128
| 16128 Kirfrieda ||  || Kirsten Linnea Frieda, 2002 Intel STS finalist || 
|-id=129
| 16129 Kevingao ||  || Kevin Kuan Gao, 2002 Intel STS finalist || 
|-id=130
| 16130 Giovine ||  || Allegra Elizabeth Giovine, 2002 Intel STS finalist || 
|-id=131
| 16131 Kaganovich ||  || Mark Kaganovich, 2002 Intel STS || 
|-id=132
| 16132 Angelakim ||  || Angela Soeun Kim, 2002 Intel STS finalist || 
|-id=135
| 16135 Ivarsson ||  || Karl R. Ivarsson (born 1939), a vertical transportation specialist in Los Angeles for 37 years.  || 
|-id=142
| 16142 Leung ||  || Albert W. Leung, 2002 Intel STS finalist || 
|-id=144
| 16144 Korsten ||  || Erich E. Korsten (born 1945), a hydrologist and amateur astronomer from Dresden who now lives in Fountain Hills, Arizona. || 
|-id=147
| 16147 Jeanli ||  || Jean Li, 2002 Intel STS finalist || 
|-id=150
| 16150 Clinch ||  || Nicholas Bayard Clinch (born 1930), of Palo Alto, California, is a celebrated alpinist, expedition leader, philanthropist and investor. || 
|-id=154
| 16154 Dabramo ||  || Germano D'Abramo (born 1973), Italian astronomer and discoverer of minor planets || 
|-id=155
| 16155 Buddy ||  || Buddy Holly (1936–1959), was an American singer, songwriter, and pioneer of Rock and Roll from Lubbock, Texas, who was clearly the brightest star since Elvis when, at the age of 22, he was tragically killed in a plane crash. His life has been celebrated on film and in the long running musical Buddy. His songs remain as timeless as ever. || 
|-id=157
| 16157 Toastmasters ||  || Toastmasters, a public speaking club, was started by Ralph C. Smedley in 1924 at a YMCA in Santa Ana, California. Today Toastmasters is an international organization that affords practice and training for men and women in the art of public speaking and in the presiding over meetings. || 
|-id=158
| 16158 Monty ||  || Monty Roberts (born 1935), a true horse whisperer, has tirelessly taught that man-animal interactions, such as the traumatic breaking of horses, is bettered through nonviolent means. His writings extend these ideas and foster peaceable human-to-human interactions. || 
|-id=163
| 16163 Suhanli ||  || Suhan Li, 2002 Intel STS finalist || 
|-id=164
| 16164 Yangli ||  || Yang Li, 2002 Intel STS finalist || 
|-id=165
| 16165 Licht ||  || Jacob Licht, 2002 Intel STS finalist || 
|-id=166
| 16166 Jonlii ||  || Jonathan Lii, 2002 Intel STS finalist || 
|-id=167
| 16167 Oertli ||  || Nicole Anne Oertli, 2002 Intel STS finalist || 
|-id=168
| 16168 Palmen ||  || Brandon Michael Palmen, 2002 Intel STS finalist || 
|-id=174
| 16174 Parihar ||  || Raminder Kaur Parihar, 2002 Intel STS finalist || 
|-id=175
| 16175 Rypatterson ||  || Ryan Randall Patterson, 2002 Intel STS || 
|-id=177
| 16177 Pelzer ||  || Justin Raymond Pelzer, 2002 Intel STS || 
|-id=180
| 16180 Rapoport ||  || Ezra Jacob Rapoport, 2002 Intel STS finalist || 
|-id=189
| 16189 Riehl ||  || Emily Elizabeth Riehl, 2002 Intel STS finalist || 
|-id=191
| 16191 Rubyroe ||  || Ruby Roe, first wife (1943–1997) of discoverer James M. Roe || 
|-id=192
| 16192 Laird ||  || Elizabeth Rebecca Laird, Canadian physicist || 
|-id=193
| 16193 Nickaiser ||  || Nicholas Kaiser (born 1954), a British astrophysicist, who studied at Leeds University and Cambridge University, was at the Canadian Institute for Theoretical Astrophysics from 1988 to 1997. Since then, he has been at the Institute for Astronomy in Hawaii. The name was suggested by P. Jedicke and R. Jedicke. || 
|-id=194
| 16194 Roderick ||  || Gavin Roderick (1977–2001) was an exceptionally bright and enthusiastic student of astrophysics at Cardiff University who died before being able to complete his studies and embark on a career in astronomy. He is greatly missed by his loving family, by his many friends and by all who taught him. || 
|-id=197
| 16197 Bluepeter ||  || After the long-running children's programme Blue Peter on BBC television || 
|-id=198
| 16198 Búzios ||  || Armação dos Búzios, Rio de Janeiro State, Brazil || 
|-id=199
| 16199 Rozenblyum ||  || Nikita Rozenblyum, 2002 Intel STS finalist || 
|}

16201–16300 

|-id=202
| 16202 Srivastava ||  || Siddharth Srivastava, 2002 Intel STS finalist || 
|-id=203
| 16203 Jessicastahl ||  || Jessica Randi Stahl, 2002 Intel STS finalist || 
|-id=207
| 16207 Montgomery ||  || Michael Montgomery (1925–2011) was a well-known jazz and ragtime piano player in the Detroit area of Michigan, and had one of the largest private collections of antique piano rolls in the U.S. || 
|-id=209
| 16209 Sterner ||  || Beckett William Sterner, 2002 Intel STS finalist || 
|-id=211
| 16211 Samirsur ||  || Samir Sur, 2002 Intel STS finalist || 
|-id=212
| 16212 Theberge ||  || Ashleigh Brooks Theberge, 2002 Intel STS finalist || 
|-id=214
| 16214 Venkatachalam ||  || Vivek Venkatachalam, 2002 Intel STS finalist || 
|-id=215
| 16215 Venkatraman ||  || Dheera Venkatraman, 2002 Intel STS finalist || 
|-id=217
| 16217 Peterbroughton ||  || Peter Broughton (born 1940) taught high-school mathematics in Toronto, Ontario. He is an amateur astronomer who served as president of the Royal Astronomical Society of Canada and received the society's Service Award in 1987. The name was suggested by P. Jedicke and R. Jedicke. || 
|-id=218
| 16218 Mintakeyes ||  || Minta Keys (born 1961) is a veterinarian in Tucson, Arizona, who provides preventive, diagnostic and therapeutic care to cats. She is also on the Board of Directors of the  Tucson Hermitage Cat Shelter. || 
|-id=219
| 16219 Venturelli ||  || Ophelia Shalini Venturelli, 2002 Intel STS finalist || 
|-id=220
| 16220 Mikewagner ||  || Michael Jacob Wagner, 2002 Intel STS finalist || 
|-id=221
| 16221 Kevinyang ||  || Kevin Yang, 2002 Intel STS finalist || 
|-id=222
| 16222 Donnanderson ||  || Donna Anderson, 2002 Intel STS mentor || 
|-id=225
| 16225 Georgebaldo ||  || George J. Baldo, 2002 Intel STS mentor || 
|-id=226
| 16226 Beaton ||  || John Beaton, 2002 Intel STS mentor || 
|-id=230
| 16230 Benson ||  || Carol Benson, 2002 Intel STS mentor || 
|-id=231
| 16231 Jessberger ||  || Elmar K. Jessberger (born 1943) is a German professor of experimental and analytical planetology and director of the Institute for Planetology at the Westfälischen Wilhelms-University in Münster. He is renowned for his work on lunar and meteorite chronology and microanalysis of cosmic dust. || 
|-id=232
| 16232 Chijagerbs ||  || James "Gerbs" Bauer (born 1968) is a planetary scientist and a discoverer of minor planets at the Jet Propulsion Laboratory whose research focuses on the physical nature of outer Solar System bodies. Chija Bauer (born 1977) is a physics teacher who helps to develop future scientists. || 
|-id=234
| 16234 Bosse ||  || Angelique Bosse, 2002 Intel STS mentor || 
|-id=236
| 16236 Stebrehmer ||  || Steven Brehmer, 2002 Intel STS mentor. He is a teacher at the Mayo High School, Rochester, Minnesota. || 
|-id=238
| 16238 Chappe ||  || Sean Chappe, 2002 Intel STS mentor || 
|-id=239
| 16239 Dower ||  || Richard Dower, 2002 Intel STS mentor || 
|-id=241
| 16241 Dvorsky ||  || Mary Ann Dvorsky, 2002 Intel STS mentor. Dvorsky is a teacher at the Montgomery Blair High School, Silver Spring, Maryland. || 
|-id=243
| 16243 Rosenbauer ||  || Helmut Rosenbauer (born 1936), German astronomer and director of the Max Planck Institute for Aeronomy in Katlenburg-Lindau. He was a leader in promoting the Philae lander on the Rosetta spacecraft to comet 67P/Churyumov-Gerasimenko. Rosenbauer is PI of the COSAC instrument, designed to measure the comet's surface chemistry. || 
|-id=244
| 16244 Brož ||  || Miroslav Brož (born 1975), a Czech celestial mechanician at Charles University, Prague. Brož specializes in numerical methods and the Yarkovsky effect, and he also teaches at The Observatory and Planetarium Hradec Králové. || 
|-id=246
| 16246 Cantor ||  || Georg Cantor (1845–1918), a Russian-born German mathematician and professor at Halle. In a series of papers beginning in 1870 he developed the theory of infinite sets and was the first to recognize and prove that there are different degrees of infinity. || 
|-id=247
| 16247 Esner ||  || William Esner, 2002 Intel STS mentor || 
|-id=248
| 16248 Fox ||  || Mitchell Fox, 2002 Intel STS mentor || 
|-id=249
| 16249 Cauchy ||  || Augustin-Louis Cauchy (1789–1857), a French mathematician who made fundamental contributions to the theory of functions of complex variables, the study of determinants and the mathematical theory of elasticity. He introduced a higher level of rigor in mathematical proofs. || 
|-id=250
| 16250 Delbó ||  || Marco Delbó (born 1972), an Italian astronomer who has contributed to the knowledge of the physical properties of near-Earth asteroids by means of thermal-infrared observations and modeling. He has derived an estimate of the thermal inertia of near-earth asteroids, which is vital for reliable calculations of orbital drift due to the Yarkovsky effect. || 
|-id=251
| 16251 Barbifrank ||  || Barbi Frank, 2002 Intel STS mentor || 
|-id=252
| 16252 Franfrost ||  || Fran Frost, 2002 Intel STS mentor || 
|-id=253
| 16253 Griffis ||  || Wanda Griffis, 2002 Intel STS mentor || 
|-id=254
| 16254 Harper ||  || Dan Harper, 2002 Intel STS mentor || 
|-id=255
| 16255 Hampton ||  || Donald L. Hampton (born 1963), an atmospheric physicist at Ball Aerospace and Technology, has served as the system engineer for all the scientific instruments on the Deep Impact mission. || 
|-id=258
| 16258 Willhayes ||  || William Hayes, 2002 Intel STS mentor || 
|-id=259
| 16259 Housinger ||  || Sharon Housinger, 2002 Intel STS mentor || 
|-id=260
| 16260 Sputnik ||  || Sputnik is the Russian name of a series of artificial satellites, the first of which ushered in the space age on 1957 Oct. 4. || 
|-id=261
| 16261 Iidemachi ||  || Iidemachi, a town is situated in the southern part of Yamagata, Japan. || 
|-id=262
| 16262 Rikurtz ||  || Richard Kurtz, 2002 Intel STS mentor || 
|-id=264
| 16264 Richlee ||  || Richard Lee, 2002 Intel STS mentor || 
|-id=265
| 16265 Lemay ||  || Ron LeMay, 2002 Intel STS mentor || 
|-id=266
| 16266 Johconnell ||  || John McConnell, 2002 Intel STS mentor || 
|-id=267
| 16267 Mcdermott ||  || Frank McDermott, 2002 Intel STS mentor || 
|-id=268
| 16268 Mcneeley ||  || Pam McNeeley, 2002 Intel STS mentor || 
|-id=269
| 16269 Merkord ||  || Pat Merkord, 2002 Intel STS mentor || 
|-id=271
| 16271 Duanenichols ||  || Duane Nichols, 2002 Intel STS mentor || 
|-id=273
| 16273 Oneill ||  || Barbara O'Neill, 2002 Intel STS mentor || 
|-id=274
| 16274 Pavlica ||  || Robert Pavlica, 2002 Intel STS mentor || 
|-id=277
| 16277 Mallada ||  || Esmeralda Mallada (born 1937), an Uruguayan astronomer and professor at the Universidad de la República, who studies minor bodies and teaches cosmography and mathematics. In 1952 she was one of the founders of the Asociación de Aficionados a la Astronomía, the oldest amateur astronomer association in Uruguay. || 
|-id=280
| 16280 Groussin ||  || Olivier Groussin (born 1976), an American planetary scientist at the University of Maryland, played a major role in the calibration of the visible-light instruments on the Deep Impact mission, and he also developed models for interpreting the results from the infrared spectrometer. || 
|}

16301–16400 

|-id=319
| 16319 Xiamenerzhong || 3252 T-1 || Named for the Xiamen No. 2 Middle School of Fujian, China, which has cultivated thousands of successful people in all walks of life since 1870, incorporating football, English, and music into school education. Name suggested by D.-h. Chen, a student of the school during 1961–1967. || 
|-id=355
| 16355 Buber ||  || Martin Buber (1878–1965), an Austrian-born Jewish philosopher and author. || 
|-id=356
| 16356 Univbalttech ||  || Балтийского государственного технического университета «Военмех» (Voenmekh Baltic State Technical University, BSTU), St. Petersburg, Russia (previously the Leningrad Institute of Mechanics) || 
|-id=357
| 16357 Risanpei ||  || Ri Sanpei (died 1655), (Li Sam Pyung in Korean) was one of the potters who was taken from the north-west Korean Peninsula to the north-west of Kyushu Island in 1598 || 
|-id=358
| 16358 Plesetsk ||  || Plesetsk Cosmodrome, main launching site of the former Soviet Union || 
|-id=367
| 16367 Astronomiasvecia ||  || The name celebrates the 2019 centenary of the Swedish Astronomical Society (Svenska astronomiska sällskapet), which was founded in 1919. || 
|-id=368
| 16368 Città di Alba || 1981 DF || Alba is an ancient town, capital of the historical region of Langhe in Piedmont. It is famous for the excellence of its gastronomy, including "tartufi", sweets and some of the best Italian wines. The Cittá di Alba was a partisan stronghold during World War II and is very active now in cultural activities || 
|-id=372
| 16372 Demichele ||  || Vincenzo De Michele (born 1936) is an Italian mineralogist and gemologist. He was the author of important works of mineralogical dissemination, including the Mineralogical Guide of Italy, and numerous essays on systematic and regional mineralogy. He was the discoverer of the Kamil impact crater (Egypt). || 
|-id=395
| 16395 Ioannpravednyj ||  || Ioannpravednyj (pious St. Ioann Kronstadtskij; Ivan Il'ich Sergiev, 1829–1908) was an archpriest who served in the cathedral of Kotlin island in the Gulf of Finland. He became famous for miraculous healing, generous charity and a pious life. He established a center to help unemployed and homeless people, the first in Russia || 
|-id=398
| 16398 Hummel ||  || Johann Nepomuk Hummel (1778–1837), famous Austrian pianist and versatile composer. || 
|-id=399
| 16399 Grokhovsky ||  || Victor Grokhovsky (born 1947), a professor of meteoritics at the Ural Federal University in Yekaterinburg, Russia. || 
|}

16401–16500 

|-id=402
| 16402 Olgapopova || 1984 UR || Olga P. Popova (born 1963), an expert in meteoroid strengths at the Institute for Dynamics of Geospheres of the Russian Academy of Sciences. || 
|-id=406
| 16406 Oszkiewicz || 1985 PH || Dagmara Oszkiewicz (born 1982), a postdoctoral researcher at the Adam Mickiewicz University in Poznań, Poland. || 
|-id=407
| 16407 Oiunskij ||  || Platon Alekseevich Sleptsov-Oiunskij (1893–1939) was a prominent Yakut writer, philosopher, scientist and public figure who had an influence on developing the national identity, science, language, literature and spiritual culture in Yakutia. || 
|-id=413
| 16413 Abulghazi ||  || Abu al-Ghazi Bahadur (1603–1663) ruled the khanate of Khorezm (now Uzbekistan). A copy of his writings on Mongols and Tatars fell into the hands of German naturalist D. G. Messerschmidt during a Siberian voyage and was published as Histoire généralogique des Tatars (Leiden, 1726). || 
|-id=414
| 16414 Le Procope ||  || Hermann Goldschmidt (1802–1866), a German painter and amateur astronomer, discovered 14 new minor planets during 1852–1861 from his living room above Le Procope café in Paris. The café, apparently the oldest in Paris, was established by Francesco Procopio in 1686 || 
|-id=418
| 16418 Lortzing ||  || Albert Lortzing (1801–1851), was a German singer, an actor and later a conductor. || 
|-id=419
| 16419 Kovalev ||  || Sergej Nikitich Kovalev (born 1919) is an outstanding shipbuilder and prominent expert in the field of mechanics and hydrodynamics of ships and energetics. He is also broadly known for his paintings and literary works || 
|-id=421
| 16421 Roadrunner || 1988 BJ || Roadruner is the common name for the Californian Earthcuckoo (Geococcyx californianus). The name comes from the habit of the bird of racing down roads in front of fast-moving vehicles || 
|-id=424
| 16424 Davaine ||  || Casimir Davaine (1812–1882) was a French physician working in the field of microbiology. In 1850 he discovered, with the pathologist Oliver Rayer, the microorganism Bacillus anthracis in the blood of diseased and dying sheep. The microorganism had the property of transmission from one animal to another. || 
|-id=425
| 16425 Chuckyeager ||  || Chuck Yeager (1923–2020) was the first pilot confirmed to have broken the sound barrier in level flight, piloting a Bell XS-1 aircraft, on the morning of October 14, 1947. || 
|-id=435
| 16435 Fándly ||  || Juraj Fándly (1750–1811) a Slovak Roman Catholic priest, writer and author of the first book in Bernolák's language Dúverná zmlúva mezi mňí chom a diáblom ("The confidential pact between the monk and the devil", 1789). He was a zealous propagator of this language and a well-known educator. || 
|-id=438
| 16438 Knöfel ||  || André Knöfel (born 1963), a German meteorologist, amateur astronomer and an observer of minor planets, who is the head of the Fireball Data Center of the International Meteor Organization. He has located precovery observations of many objects in the Digital Sky Survey, among them this minor planet and the trans-Neptunian object 20000 Varuna. || 
|-id=439
| 16439 Yamehoshinokawa || 1989 BZ || Yamehoshinokawa, Japanese river || 
|-id=441
| 16441 Kirchner ||  || Ernst Ludwig Kirchner (1880–1938), a German painter, graphic artist and sculptor. || 
|-id=444
| 16444 Godefroy ||  || Godefroy Wendelin (1580–1660) was a Belgian canon of the Liège episcopacy and an astronomer who erected the first astronomical observatory at the Signal de Lure near Mont Ventoux in Provence. The name was suggested by F. M. van der Mersch || 
|-id=445
| 16445 Klimt ||  || Gustav Klimt  (1862–1918), an Austrian painter and one of the most prominent members of the Vienna Art Nouveau movement. His paintings, characterized by elegant gold and colorful ornamentation, express subtle erotic feelings, as in "Die Jungfrau" (1907) and "Dana" (1913). || 
|-id=447
| 16447 Vauban || 1989 RX || Sébastien Le Prestre de Vauban (1633–1707), a French marshal and strategist of genius || 
|-id=449
| 16449 Kigoyama || 1989 SO || Mount Kigoyama (546 m), Iahikawa prefecture, Japan, at whose summit are a planetarium and public observatory || 
|-id=450
| 16450 Messerschmidt ||  || Daniel Gottlieb Messerschmidt (1685–1735), a German naturalist who was sent by Peter the Great on an expedition to Siberia during 1719–1728. The first person to study systematically the "rumors" about "frozen" mammoths, he investigated thoroughly Siberian fauna and flora, as well as its mineralogy and geography. || 
|-id=452
| 16452 Goldfinger ||  || Pauline J. ("PJ") Goldfinger, American adaptive-optics operator, who assisted in organizing the photographic glass plate archive of the 1.2-m Schmidt Oschin Telescope at Palomar Observatory || 
|-id=459
| 16459 Barth ||  || Karl Barth (1886–1968), a Swiss Protestant Reformed theologian and professor in Basel beginning in 1935. In Germany, he is known as the "Vater der Bekennende Kirche" where he was ousted from his post. His main works are "The Epistle to the Romans" and "Ecclesiastical Dogmatics". || 
|-id=463
| 16463 Nayoro || 1990 EK || Nayoro, Hokkaido, Japan || 
|-id=465
| 16465 Basilrowe ||  || Basil H. Rowe (born 1960), a founding member of and current president of the Friends of the Cincinnati Observatory. || 
|-id=466
| 16466 Piyashiriyama ||  || Mount Piyashiri (Piyashiri Yama), Hokkaido, Japan || 
|-id=479
| 16479 Paulze ||  || Marie-Anne Paulze Lavoisier (1758–1836), wife and scientific collaborator of French chemist Antoine Lavoisier || 
|-id=481
| 16481 Thames ||  || The Thames, with a length of nearly 350 km, is the chief river in southern England. || 
|-id=494
| 16494 Oka ||  || Oka River, flowing from the central Russian Upland to eventually join the Volga || 
|-id=497
| 16497 Toinevermeylen ||  || Antoine (Toine) Vermeylen (1937–2012) was a good friend of the discoverer. || 
|-id=498
| 16498 Passau ||  || The Bavarian town of Passau in Germany || 
|}

16501–16600 

|-id=503
| 16503 Ayato || 1990 TY || Ayato Seki (born 2005), a grandchild of Japanese discoverer Tsutomu Seki || 
|-id=505
| 16505 Sulzer ||  || Robert Sulzer-Forrer (1873–1953), a Swiss industrialist from Winterthur and member of the Sulzer dynasty || 
|-id=507
| 16507 Fuuren ||  || The Japanese town of Fūren, Hokkaido. It is known for its fine rice. || 
|-id=513
| 16513 Vasks ||  || Pēteris Vasks (born 1946), Latvian composer and contra-bassist || 
|-id=514
| 16514 Stevelia ||  || Steve Goldberg (born 1949) and Amelia Goldberg (born 1940). They have spent years teaching beginners to observe the night sky. Amelia's Universe Sampler, a booklet of simple projects for beginners with small telescopes, is an official project of the Astronomical League. The couple has also helped manage the annual Texas Star Party || 
|-id=515
| 16515 Usmanʹgrad ||  || The town of Usmanʹ, Russia. It was founded in 1645, and is the birthplace of: physicist and Nobel Prize winner Nikolay Basov (1922–2001), astronomer and discoverer of minor planets Nikolai Chernykh (1931–2004) and the ethnographer B. P. Knyazhinskij (1892–1975). || 
|-id=516
| 16516 Efremlevitan ||  || Efrem Pavlovich Levitan (born 1934) is a Russian teacher, scientist, writer, journalist and the deputy editor-in-chief of the magazine The Earth and the Universe. For 55 years he has popularized astronomy in books, papers and lectures. || 
|-id=518
| 16518 Akihikoito || 1990 WF || Akihiko Ito (born 1959) is one of the leading CCD astrophotographers in Japan. He has shared his knowledge and skill with others from around the world who are interested in this field and contributed to great improvements in CCD imaging || 
|-id=522
| 16522 Tell ||  || William Tell, legendary folk hero of Switzerland || 
|-id=524
| 16524 Hausmann ||  || Manfred Hausmann (1898–1986), who was born in Kassel and died in Bremen, lived for many years in Worpswede and wrote lyrical poetry, stories and novels. Widely traveled, he studied distant cultures and translated their works. After 1945 he turned to Christianity and became a preacher || 
|-id=525
| 16525 Shumarinaiko ||  || Lake Shumarinai, located in the Shumarinai Prefectural Natural Park, Hokkaido, Japan || 
|-id=528
| 16528 Terakado || 1991 GV || Kazuo Terakado (born 1947), Japanese scientific journalist and author || 
|-id=529
| 16529 Dangoldin ||  || Dan Goldin (born 1940), American NASA administrator || 
|-id=543
| 16543 Rosetta ||  || The Rosetta space probe, which successfully visited comet 67P/Churyumov–Gerasimenko in 2014 || 
|-id=544
| 16544 Hochlehnert ||  || Horst Hochlehnert (born 1944) is a well-known German radiologist, radio ham operator and a good friend of the first discoverer. || 
|-id=552
| 16552 Sawamura || 1991 SB || Tsuneo Sawamura (born 1928), a Japanese inventor. His anti-corrosion solder was used for the electrical systems of the Space Shuttle. || 
|-id=555
| 16555 Nagaomasami ||  || Masami Nagao (1966–1984), Japanese amateur astronomer || 
|-id=560
| 16560 Daitor ||  || Daitor, a Trojan warrior who was killed by Teucer (Teukros) in Greek mythology || 
|-id=561
| 16561 Rawls ||  || John Rawls (1921–2002), American moral and political philosopher, known for his book A Theory of Justice || 
|-id=563
| 16563 Ob ||  || Ob River, flowing from the Altai Mountains to eventually join the Irtish, on which Joseph-Nicolas Delisle traveled in April 1740 to observe a transit of Mercury || 
|-id=564
| 16564 Coriolis ||  || Gaspard-Gustave de Coriolis (1792–1843), French mathematician, mechanical engineer and scientist || 
|-id=578
| 16578 Essjayess ||  || Shirley June Steel (S. J. S., pronounced: "Ess Jay Ess", née Parsons), mother of British discoverer Duncan Steel || 
|-id=583
| 16583 Oersted ||  || Hans Christian Ørsted (1777–1851), a Danish physicist and chemist. || 
|-id=587
| 16587 Nagamori || 1992 SE || Kyouji Nagamori (born 1932), Japanese planetary ephemeride calculator || 
|-id=588
| 16588 Johngee || 1992 ST || John Gee (?), who has provided leadership and service to the Caltech Class of 1953 and the Caltech community for more than half a century, including a stint as president of the Alumni Association || 
|-id=589
| 16589 Hastrup ||  || Rolf Hastrup (born 1930), who was involved with NASA's Surveyor and Viking programs. He continues his long career at Caltech's Jet Propulsion Laboratory, planning future uncrewed space missions. He is a classmate of the discoverer's husband (Caltech class of 1953) and long time friend || 
|-id=590
| 16590 Brunowalter ||  || Bruno Walter (1876–1962), German-American conductor and composer || 
|-id=594
| 16594 Sorachi ||  || Sorachi District, Hokkaido, Japan || 
|-id=596
| 16596 Stephenstrauss ||  || Steven Strauss (born 1943), science writer at the Canadian Toronto The Globe and Mail who received the Connaught medal in 1995 || 
|-id=598
| 16598 Brugmansia ||  || Brugmansia, known as "angel's trumpets", a genus of flowering plants in the family Solanaceae. They are woody trees or shrubs, with pendulous flowers, and have no spines on their fruit. || 
|-id=599
| 16599 Shorland ||  || John Herschel Shorland, a direct descendant of John Herschel, has recently completed his own Herschel Archives in Norfolk, England. These archives include various documents and instruments associated with the Herschels, including the 7-foot telescope probably used by William Herschel to discover Uranus || 
|}

16601–16700 

|-id=602
| 16602 Anabuki ||  || Katsuhiko Anabuki (born 1955) was born in Marugame City, Kagawa prefecture. While running a printing business, he is active as an amateur astronomer, a member of Shikoku Astronomical Society and dedicated to astrophotography || 
|-id=623
| 16623 Muenzel ||  || Gisela Muenzel was the life partner of Hilmar W. Duerbeck. Over the last 20 years, she contributed various papers on the history of astronomy, and collaborated with Duerbeck on diverse historical archives of astronomers and observatories || 
|-id=624
| 16624 Hoshizawa || 1993 HX || Sachiko Hoshizawa (born 1951), a Japanese cook, television personality, and space enthusiast. He appears daily on a Japanese television program about cooking and has introduced more than 3800 dishes using the produce of Hokkaido. A great space enthusiast, she developed and in 2000 presented to the astronaut Kouichi Wakata a special soybean soup for space. || 
|-id=625
| 16625 Kunitsugu ||  || Kunitsugu Terakado, Japanese project leader at the National Space Development Agency (NASDA) || 
|-id=626
| 16626 Thumper ||  || Thumper, fictional young rabbit in Walt Disney's 1942 animated film Bambi || 
|-id=641
| 16641 Esteban ||  || Manuel (born 1940) and Gloria (born 1940) Esteban have been an admired and popular couple at the California State University, Chico, where he served very ably as president from 1993 to 2003. Both Barcelona-born, Manuel is also known for his ability as an artistic glassblower and Gloria for her interest in art and literature. || 
|-id=644
| 16644 Otemaedaigaku ||  || Otemaedaigaku, a private university in Japan || 
|-id=645
| 16645 Aldalara ||  || ALDA, the Asociación Larense de Astronomía, is the association of amateur astronomers of Lara State, Venezuela. Since its foundation in 1985 its members have not only engaged in astronomical activities but have developed extensive educational and outreach activity, involving students and people from the general community || 
|-id=646
| 16646 Sparrman ||  || Anders Sparrman (1748–1820), Swedish botanist, pupil of Linnaeus, who went around the world with James Cook's second voyage and wrote about it in A voyage to the Cape of Good Hope, towards the Antarctic polar circle, and round the world (1789) || 
|-id=647
| 16647 Robbydesmet ||  || Robby De Smet (born 1979), the son-in-law of the discoverer and a process foreman at a company in Antwerp (Zwijndrecht). (1789) || 
|-id=650
| 16650 Sakushingakuin ||  || Sakushi Gakuin is a long-established school within a combined elementary, junior and senior secondary school system in Utsunomiya, Tochigi Prefecture, Japan. || 
|-id=666
| 16666 Liroma ||  || The Meiers are a family of amateur astronomers living near Ottawa, Ontario. Linda (born 1950) is an active observer. Between 1978 and 1984, Rolf (born 1953) discovered four comets and has recently built an observatory. Son Matthew (born 1985) has joined the Royal Astronomical Society of Canada's Ottawa Center. || 
|-id=669
| 16669 Rionuevo ||  || The Rio Nuevo project at Flandrau Science Center in Rio Nuevo, a district of Tucson, Arizona. It is an effort to understand the city's history stretching back at least 2500 years, and to preserve and develop its heritage. Tucson's Rio Nuevo project is supported by the University of Arizona. It will benefit all students of the history of the American Southwest. || 
|-id=671
| 16671 Tago ||  || Akira Tago (born 1926) has been the honorary president at Tokyo Future University since 2008 and is an authority in educational psychology. || 
|-id=672
| 16672 Bedini ||  || Daniele Bedini (born 1952) is currently director at a university consortium in Florence and teaches space architecture at the Space International University in Strasbourg. He wrote a thesis on space architecture, the first of its kind in Europe. || 
|-id=674
| 16674 Birkeland ||  || Kristian Olaf Birkeland (1867–1917) was a Norwegian scientist who elucidated the nature of the aurora borealis. He constructed an electromagnetic device enabling him to simulate the light of the polar aurora by directing a beam of cathode rays (electrons) on a sphere in a vacuum tank || 
|-id=675
| 16675 Torii ||  || From 1985 to 2014 Hidemitsu Torii (born 1947) was the director general of Sanko Gakuen in Tokyo, which specializes in welfare, early childhood education and child psychology. He is well known as an enthusiastic educator. || 
|-id=676
| 16676 Tinne ||  || Alexine Tinne (1835–1869), a Dutch explorer and photographer who travelled through the Central Nile region and Central Africa. During her expeditions she collected plants, including several new species, and objects of art. || 
|-id=680
| 16680 Minamitanemachi ||  || The Japanese town of Minamitanemachi, located in the southern part of Tanegashima Island, Kagoshima. It is well known as the town where a gun was introduced to Japan for the first time in 1543. It is also known for the Tanegashima Space Center. || 
|-id=682
| 16682 Donati || 1994 FB || Giovanni Battista Donati (1826–1873), an Italian astronomer from Tuscany. He made important contributions to the early development of stellar spectroscopy, being also the first to observe a cometary spectrum. He was director of the Florence Observatory and discoverer of six comets, among them the spectacular naked-eye comet C/1858 L1. || 
|-id=683
| 16683 Alepieri || 1994 JY || Alessandro Pieri (1969–2000) was an Italian amateur astronomer from childhood and was for many years a member of the Associazione Astrofili Valdinievole, an organization of amateur astronomers in northern Tuscany. He was an active meteor observer and an astrophotographer. || 
|-id=689
| 16689 Vistula ||  || Vistula river, flowing from the Beskidy Mountains of southern Poland to the Baltic Sea past Krakóv, Warsaw and Gdańsk || 
|-id=690
| 16690 Fabritius ||  || Carel Fabritius (1622–1654, a Dutch painter and one of Rembrandt's most gifted pupils. || 
|-id=693
| 16693 Moseley ||  || Terence J. C. A. Moseley (born 1946), editor of Stardust, 1992 Aidan P. Fitzgerald Medallist and founding member of the Irish Federation of Astronomical Societies, was the first amateur to use the recently restored six-foot Birr telescope in Sept. 2001. || 
|-id=695
| 16695 Terryhandley || 1995 AM || Terry Handley (1952–2015) was an American amateur astronomer and discoverer of minor planets with Asperger syndrome. In the late 1980s he was recognized as the only amateur astronomer in North America measuring positions of comets and minor planets. He ran a sky survey that resulted in the discovery of 7 minor planets. Name suggested by G. W. Kronk. || 
|-id=696
| 16696 Villamayor ||  || Waldemar Villamayor-Venialbo (born 1970), a well-known popularizer of astronomy in Paraguay and the author of numerous articles on science whose main interests are celestial mechanics and minor planets. || 
|-id=700
| 16700 Seiwa || 1995 DZ || Seiwa village, where the Seiwa-Kogen public observatory is located, is in the center of the island of Kyushu. || 
|}

16701–16800 

|-
| 16701 Volpe ||  || Miguel A. Volpe Borgonon (born 1947), a Paraguayan amateur astronomer, professor of engineering at the Universidad Nacional de Asunción and one of the founders of the Club de Astrofìsica del Paraguay. || 
|-id=702
| 16702 Buxner ||  || Sanlyn R. Buxner (born 1978) is known for her work in space science education and public outreach, including curriculum development, teacher workshops, and program evaluation. Her focus is on how science research experiences empower teachers and students and improve their science understanding. || 
|-id=703
| 16703 Richardstrauss ||  || Bavarian-German Richard Strauss (1864–1949) was a composer of the late German romantic and early-modern eras of 20th-century music who composed the operas Der Rosenkavalier and Salome, as well as the tone poems Zarathustra (1896) and Eine Alpen Symfonie (1911–1915). || 
|-id=705
| 16705 Reinhardt ||  || Max Reinhardt (Maximilian Goldmann, 1873–1943), an Austrian stage director and theater manager who worked mainly in Berlin and Vienna. He was a cofounder of the "Salzburger Festspiele". His productions of classic dramas caused an enormous stir. In 1933 he emigrated from Germany. || 
|-id=706
| 16706 Svojsík ||  || Antonín Benjamin Svojsík (1876–1938), Czech founder of the Czechoslovak Boy Scout organization Junák in 1912. He led it from 1914 until his death and was a member of the executive committee of the world Scout movement. After repeated bans between 1939 and 1989, Junák is now the most popular Czech children's organization. || 
|-id=707
| 16707 Norman ||  || Lennie Norman (born 1948) and his father Charlie Norman (1920–2005) were both entertaining musicians. Lennie is also a very talented stand-up comedian || 
|-id=709
| 16709 Auratian ||  || Auratian has been the patron saint of České Budějovice since 1670. According to legend, he was a Roman soldier living in the 2nd or 3rd century, executed for his Christian faith. Originally buried in the Calixt catacombs in Rome, his remains were transferred to Bohemia in 1634. Named on the 750th anniversary of the town. || 
|-id=710
| 16710 Kluyver ||  || Helena A. Kluyver (1909–2001) was a Dutch astronomer who worked on the orbits of comets. She was also known for her research on stellar motions in the Hyades cluster and was an assistant at the General Secretary Office of the International Astronomical Union for many years. || 
|-id=711
| 16711 Ka-Dar ||  || The astronomical observatory of Ka-Dar scientific center is the first private observatory in Russia open to the public. Founded on 2004 June 8, the observatory works for the popularization of scientific activity by amateur astronomers and their collaboration with professional astronomers || 
|-id=713
| 16713 Airashi ||  || Airashi, located in the center of Kagoshima prefecture, is a new city created in 2010 by the combination of three towns. Airashi contains a number of historic sites || 
|-id=714
| 16714 Arndt ||  || German patriotic writer and poet Ernst Moritz Arndt (1769–1860), born on the island of Rügen, was a professor of history at the University of Greifswald (which now bears his name), as well as in Bonn. A passionate agitator and singer of the German Wars for Liberation, he stood up for a revival in Germany || 
|-id=715
| 16715 Trettenero ||  || Virgilio Trettenero (1822–1868), an Italian astronomer who succeeded Santini as professor of astronomy at Padua. At the observatory there he observed minor planets, comets and eclipses and calculated orbits and ephemerides. || 
|-id=718
| 16718 Morikawa ||  || Yoshiki Morikawa (born 1981), a Japanese amateur astronomer and popularizer of astronomy in Tokyo. || 
|-id=719
| 16719 Mizokami ||  || Yoshihiro Mizokami (born 1952), the president of the steering committee of the Inagawa Observatory since 2002. || 
|-id=723
| 16723 Fumiofuke ||  || Fumio Fuke (1949–2007) was a Japanese aerospace engineer who contributed to the success of the mission `KAGUYA' as a leader of the design and development of transponders used for the RSAT mission, which enabled the measurement of the gravity field of the far side of the moon || 
|-id=724
| 16724 Ullilotzmann ||  || Ulrich (‘Ulli') Lotzmann (born 1956) is a German space historian, artist and astrophotographer. He is an expert in Apollo era spaceflight crew equipment and spacecraft systems and is a key contributor to the Apollo Lunar Surface Journal. Name suggested by E. Jones and K. Glover. || 
|-id=725
| 16725 Toudono ||  || Toudono mountain (height 1203 meters) is located in the west of the discoverer's home town, Shirataka, Yamagata prefecture || 
|-id=730
| 16730 Nijisseiki ||  || The Niji-sseiki fruit is a type of locally cultivated pear representative of and having a strong affinity to Tottori prefecture, a major pear producing area in which Saji village is located. In English, Niji-sseiki translates as "twentieth Century". || 
|-id=731
| 16731 Mitsumata ||  || Mitsumata is an ingredient used in traditional Japanese papermaking and represents a local Saji industry. Saji village produces the major share of this country's handmade Japanese paper, the paper of choice for the writing of calligraphy. || 
|-id=736
| 16736 Tongariyama ||  || Tongariyama mountain (height 901 meters) is located in the west of the discoverer's home town, Shirataka, Yamagata prefecture || 
|-id=740
| 16740 Kipthorne ||  || Kip Thorne (born 1940) is an astrophysicist working principally in the field of gravitation physics. The youngest full professor in the history of the California Institute of Technology, he was coauthor of the famous book, Gravitation (1973), with John Wheeler and Charles Mismer. || 
|-id=742
| 16742 Zink || 1996 ON || Johann Josef Zink (1842–1920), a publisher who issued postcards and guides in South Bohemia. || 
|-id=744
| 16744 Antonioleone ||  || Antonio Leone (born 1940), an Italian amateur astronomer from Taranto has developed principles of orbital motion in a manner easy for amateurs to understand since the early 1970s. This has resulted in two books, Introduzione alla Meccanica Celeste and, with a co-author, Elementi di Calcolo delle Orbite. || 
|-id=745
| 16745 Zappa ||  || Giovanni Zappa (1884–1923) an Italian astronomer who was an assistant at the observatory of the Collegio Romano, adjunct astronomer at Catania, astronomer at Capodimonte and director of the observatory of Collurania and Collegio Romano. Interested in classical astronomy, he calculated orbits of minor planets and comets. || 
|-id=749
| 16749 Vospini || 1996 QE || Giancarlo Vospini (1935–2017) was an electronic engineer by profession and amateur astronomer by vocation. He was a member of the Sormano Astronomical Observatory and particularly active in popularization. || 
|-id=750
| 16750 Marisandoz || 1996 QL || Mari Sandoz (1896–1966), an American historian, biographer and novelist who wrote 21 books and stories about life on the Great Plains. Her first book, Old Jules, was published in 1935 after it won the Atlantic Nonfiction Prize. She also wrote Crazy Horse, a biography of the Sioux Chief, and Cheyenne Autumn, about Native Americans leaving the reservation. || 
|-id=755
| 16755 Cayley ||  || Arthur Cayley (1821–1895), an English mathematician who started out as a practicing lawyer but in 1863 became a professor of mathematics at Cambridge. He published papers on many topics in algebra and geometry and was the founder, together with Sylvester, of the theory of algebraic invariants. || 
|-id=756
| 16756 Keuskamp ||  || Diederik H.G. Keuskamp (1915–1992) was a professor of anesthesiology and a Dutch amateur astronomer with a great interest in comets. As a medical professional he contributed to the development of methods in the field of artificial respiration. || 
|-id=757
| 16757 Luoxiahong ||  || Luoxia Hong (140–87 BC) was the most famous folk astronomer in ancient China. He performed accurate observations with instruments (e.g., the equatorial armillary sphere) he made himself. He also produced Tai Chu Calendar, the first mathematical astronomy system in China, the standard for two millennia. || 
|-id=759
| 16759 Furuyama ||  || Shigeru Furuyama (born 1953) is a post-office clerk and renowned amateur astronomer in Japan. During his nine-year visual search for comets, Furuyama independently discovered C/1975 T2. In 1979 he changed from visual to photographic observing and later discovered C/1987 W2. || 
|-id=760
| 16760 Masanori ||  || Masanori Sato (born 1952) is a member of Matsue Astronomy Club. He has popularized astronomy in Shimane prefecture and is an observing partner of the discoverer. || 
|-id=761
| 16761 Hertz ||  || Heinrich Hertz (1857–1894), a German physicist who substantially advanced knowledge of electricity. His experiments demonstrated the existence and examined the nature of electromagnetic waves, thereby opening the road to some of the most important achievements of modern technology. || 
|-id=765
| 16765 Agnesi || 1996 UA || Maria Gaetana Agnesi (1718–1799), an Italian mathematician who became the first woman in the western world who can properly be called a mathematician. She wrote a treatise on algebra that was widely translated, and in 1750 she was appointed to a professorship at the University of Bologna. || 
|-id=766
| 16766 Righi || 1996 UP || Augusto Righi (1850–1920), an Italian physicist who continued Heinrich Hertz's research on electromagnetism and served as an inspiration to his student Marconi. || 
|-id=770
| 16770 Angkor Wat ||  || Angkor Wat is a temple complex in Cambodia, built from the early twelfth century, that is the largest religious archaeological site in the world. || 
|-id=777
| 16777 Bosma ||  || Albert Bosma (born 1948) is a Dutch astronomer known for his 1978 thesis "The distribution of neutral hydrogen in spiral galaxies of various morphological types", in which he suggested that galaxies contain significant dark matter. || 
|-id=779
| 16779 Mittelman ||  || David Ross Mittelman (1954–2017) was an amateur astronomer and astrophotographer as well as a patron of astronomy, education and medicine. He was instrumental in establishing the MDW Hydrogen-Alpha Sky Survey to create a large-scale mosaic of the heavens with deep CCD images. || 
|-id=781
| 16781 Renčín ||  || Vladimír Renčín (born 1941) is a Czech graphic artist, illustrator and cartoonist. He published several books of cartoons, where various features of the Czech character are illustrated. || 
|-id=783
| 16783 Bychkov ||  || Victor Dmitrievich Bychkov (born 1952), an astronomer at the Special Astrophysical Observatory, Zelenchukskaya. || 
|-id=788
| 16788 Alyssarose ||  || Alyssa Rose Rhoden (born 1980), an American planetary scientist who studies icy moons throughout the Solar System and identified the first geologic evidence of Europa's obliquity. She is a professor at Arizona State University, a mother, a runner, and in her spare time works to promote global food sustainability. || 
|-id=790
| 16790 Yuuzou ||  || Yuuzou Hasegawa (1956–2007) was a Japanese aerospace engineer who contributed to the success of the mission `KAGUYA' as a leader of design, development and operations of Ground Test Facilities/Equipment, thereby realizing some unusual verifications and tests that assured 15 special KAGUYA flights || 
|-id=794
| 16794 Cucullia ||  || The caterpillar of the North American Asteroid Moth Cucullia asteroides feeds on flowers of the family Asteraceae. The Latin word cucullus means a hood, and it refers to a hood-like arrangement of hairs on the thorax of the adult moth. The citation was prepared by J. B. Tatum (Src). || 
|-id=796
| 16796 Shinji ||  || Shinji Tsuruta (1957–2008) was a Japanese aerospace engineer who contributed to the success of the mission `KAGUYA' as a leader of design and development of the batteries that supplied electrical energy to all the on-board components of the KAGUYA, OKINA and OUNA spacecraft || 
|-id=797
| 16797 Wilkerson ||  || Winston S. Wilkerson, uncle of the first discoverer's wife, is a member of the physics faculty at The Cooper Union for the Advancement of Science and Art in New York. His interests have concentrated on variable stars, and he has been a member of the American Association of Variable Star Observers for many years. || 
|}

16801–16900 

|-
| 16801 Petřínpragensis ||  || Petřín, Petrin Hill and gardens in Prague, site of an observation tower (built in 1891 and modelled on the Eiffel Tower) and the Stefanik Observatory (Štefánikova Hvězdárna) † ‡ || 
|-id=802
| 16802 Rainer ||  || Rainer Gebetsroither (1976–1998) devoted his life to observations of nature as well as to the history and technology of railways. He suffered from a serious heart disease since his birth His parents Karin and Uwe are long-term members of the Linzer Astronomische Gemeinschaft (Linzer A.G.). || 
|-id=804
| 16804 Bonini ||  || Claire Bonini (born 1951) is a schoolteacher who been active in teaching astronomy in French primary schools. She is the daughter of Robert and Henriette Chemin, observers at the Côte d'Azur Observatory Schmidt telescope. Her 1990 experiment in a Sevran kindergarten was extended nationally and to other age groups. || 
|-id=807
| 16807 Terasako ||  || Masanori Terasako (born 1951), a renowned amateur astronomer in Japan. || 
|-id=809
| 16809 Galápagos || 1997 US || The Galápagos Islands are a world heritage site and provide a living history of evolution. Assisted by the Charles Darwin Research Station located there, scientists have made many discoveries. The station also helps to preserve this National Park with its famous animals, such as the giant tortoises and the Darwin finches. || 
|-id=810
| 16810 Pavelaleksandrov ||  || Pavel Alexandrov (1896–1982) Pavel Alexandrov was a Russian mathematician and a student of Pavel Urysohn, with whom he later wrote a fundamental paper on compact topological spaces. After a stint as a theater producer, he became a professor at Moscow State University. || 
|-id=813
| 16813 Ronmastaler ||  || Ronald A. Mastaler (born 1955) is an atmospheric scientist and a fluent translator and interpreter of the Russian language. With the Spacewatch project since 2013, he has been a prolific asteroid astrometrist. || 
|-id=817
| 16817 Onderlička ||  || Bedřich Onderlička (1923–1994), was a prominent Czech astrophysicist and enthusiastic pedagogue who headed the department of astrophysics of Masaryk University in Brno, Czech Republic. He specialized in stellar kinematics and chemistry of late-type stars. || 
|-id=826
| 16826 Daisuke ||  || Daisuke Miyajima (1958–2007) was a Japanese aerospace engineer who contributed much to the success of `KAGUYA' as a lead engineer of EMC design, control and verification tests that reduced the EMC noise and provided a quiet environment for mission sensors that needed to hear even a tiny voice from the moon || 
|-id=829
| 16829 Richardfrench ||  || Richard G. French (born 1949), an American planetary astronomer, director of the Whitin Observatory, and professor at Wellesley College, who studies planetary rings and small Solar System bodies by means of occultation. He has also been a team member of the Cassini–Huygens mission to Saturn, leading the Radio Science Team (Src). || 
|-id=847
| 16847 Sanpoloamosciano ||  || The Astronomical Observatory of San Polo a Mosciano (Osservatorio Astronomico di San Polo a Mosciano), the discovery site of this minor planet. The observatory is located at the small town of the same name, near Florence, Italy, and operated by the Associazione Astrofili Fiorentini. The first image of this minor planet shows it close to the M1 nebula. This was one of the few observations of minor planets taken at the observatory, which is usually involved in the study of variable stars. || 
|-id=852
| 16852 Nuredduna ||  || Created by Majorcan poet Miquel Costa i Llobera in his poem The inheritance of the Greek genius, Nuredduna is a priestess, a great visionary who belonged to a primitive nation that built many megalithic monuments called Talaiots that even nowadays are present in the Balearic islands. || 
|-id=853
| 16853 Masafumi ||  || Masafumi Kimura (1959–2009) was a Japanese aerospace engineer who calculated the spacecraft orbit and contributed much to the success of `KAGUYA' as leader of design of the high-gain antenna that allows communication between the moon and the earth || 
|-id=856
| 16856 Banach ||  || Stefan Banach (1892–1945) was a Polish mathematician and professor at the University of Lviv. His major contributions were in functional analysis, particularly the theory of complete normed linear spaces, now generally known as Banach spaces. || 
|-id=857
| 16857 Goodall ||  || Kirk Goodall (born 1964) was the Mars Pathfinder Web Engineer, and was instrumental in setting up the relationships with other countries and industry for mirror websites that allowed Mars Pathfinder to provide information to millions of people around the world. || 
|-id=861
| 16861 Lipovetsky ||  || Valentin Alexandrovich Lipovetsky (1945–1996) was a senior researcher at the Special Astrophysical Observatory, Zelenchukskaya, and headed a group studying Blue Compact Galaxies. || 
|-id=869
| 16869 Košinár ||  || Ladislav Košinár (born 1929), mentor of amateur astronomy in Slovakia, founded the astronomical observatory in Sobotište in 1972. Long-time chairman of the Slovak Union of Amateur Astronomers, he is now an honorary member of the SUAA and of the Slovak Astronomical Society. The name was suggested by P. Rapavý || 
|-id=874
| 16874 Kurtwahl ||  || Kurt Wahl, 2003 Intel STS mentor. He teaches at the Troy High School, Fullerton, California. || 
|-id=878
| 16878 Tombickler ||  || Thomas C. Bickler (born 1950) is responsible for the NEAT camera electronics. He has experience with imaging instruments and has worked with CCD camera electronics systems extensively. During his 21 years at the Jet Propulsion Laboratory he helped develop and deliver flight hardware for Galileo, Cassini and Space Telescope. He is also a member of the Wide Field Camera 3 development team. || 
|-id=879
| 16879 Campai ||  || Paolo Campai (born 1957), an Italian amateur astronomer from Florence, is principally involved in astronomical photography and teaching. The discoverers met him in the course of observations of alpha Phoenicis and comet 1P/Halley in 1985 on a superb night near Florence || 
|-id=887
| 16887 Blouke ||  || Morley Blouke (born 1941) is a well-known microelectronician, whose pioneering development of thinned CCDs gave rise to the WF/PC I focal plane. He now heads advanced development at Scientific Imaging Technologies, Inc., in Tigard, Oregon. || 
|-id=888
| 16888 Michaelbarber ||  || Michael R. Barber (born 1947), an American lawyer and amateur astronomer in the gamma-ray bursts field at the Santa Barbara Astronomical Group, co-founded a small CCD brand that in 1991 developed star tracking equipment, allowing the start of CCD revolution in the amateur astronomer's world. || 
|-id=892
| 16892 Vaissière ||  || Franck Vaissière (born 1958) has been responsible for the technical activity to the T60 association at the Pic du Midi Observatory. He also took part in H alpha coronographic observations and cowrote a book on this extraordinary astronomical site. He has long been treasurer of the Association des Utilisateurs de Détecteurs Electroniques. || 
|-id=900
| 16900 Lozère ||  || Mont Lozère is the highest summit of the Cevennes mountains of the Massif Central in France at 1699 meters. The discovering Pises Observatory is located nearby. Lozère is also the name of the 48th French département. || 
|}

16901–17000 

|-
| 16901 Johnbrooks ||  || John J. Brooks (born 1933), a mechanical engineer and amateur astronomer in the gamma-ray bursts field at the Santa Barbara Astronomical Group, co-founded a small CCD brand that in 1991 developed star tracking equipment, allowing the start of the CCD revolution in the amateur astronomer's world. || 
|-id=906
| 16906 Giovannisilva ||  || Giovanni Silva (1882–1957), an Italian astronomer who was an assistant at the International Latitude Station at Carloforte and later director of the Padua Observatory until 1952. He contributed to classical astronomy, celestial mechanics, geodesy, astrophysics and the calculus of probability. || 
|-id=908
| 16908 Groeselenberg ||  || Groeselenberg, a hill in Uccle, Belgium, and location of the Uccle Observatory || 
|-id=909
| 16909 Miladejager ||  || Mila De Jager (born 2005) is the first granddaughter of the discoverer, Eric Walter Elst, and daughter of Sigyn and Philip De Jager. || 
|-id=912
| 16912 Rhiannon ||  || Rhiannon, a Welsh goddess and a mistress of the Singing Birds. Sometimes she appeared as a beautiful woman in dazzling gold on a white horse. She is a version of the proto-Celtic horse-goddess Epona. || 
|-id=915
| 16915 Bredthauer ||  || Richard Bredthauer (born 1946) has been a CCD designer for the last 23 years, providing high-performance CCDs to the astronomical community. Richard has also fabricated several flight CCDs for NASA missions. including the Hubble Space Telescope. || 
|-id=920
| 16920 Larrywalker ||  || Larry Walker, 2003 Intel STS mentor. He teaches at the Oak Ridge High School, Conroe, Texas. || 
|-id=929
| 16929 Hurník ||  || Ilja Hurník (1922–2013), a Czech composer, pianist, writer, musical pedagogue, speaker and popularizer, has a keen interest in science, particularly in astronomy. The name was suggested by participants of the meeting organized on the occasion of naming the Johann Palisa Observatory and Planetarium in Ostrava-Poruba. || 
|-id=930
| 16930 Respighi ||  || Lorenzo Respighi (1824–1889), an Italian astronomer who was professor of optics and astronomy and director successively of the observatories of Bologna and of Campidoglio in Rome. He compiled stellar catalogues, observed the planets and discovered three comets. He introduced the use of the objective prism in stellar spectroscopy, Italian astronomer || 
|-id=944
| 16944 Wangler ||  || Julie Wangler, 2003 Intel STS mentor. She teaches at the Los Alamos High School, Los Alamos, New Mexico. || 
|-id=946
| 16946 Farnham ||  || Tony L. Farnham (born 1964), an American astronomer and discoverer of minor planets at the University of Maryland, who has studied the dynamics of cometary dust and determined comet rotation states. He has also contributed to the Deep Impact mission by improving the standardization of filter photometry. || 
|-id=947
| 16947 Wikrent ||  || Brian Wikrent, 2003 Intel STS mentor. He teaches at the Robbinsdale Cooper High School, New Hope, Minnesota. || 
|-id=951
| 16951 Carolus Quartus || 1998 KJ || Charles IV, Holy Roman Emperor (1316–1378), king of Bohemia and Holy Roman Emperor, supported cultural and scientific advancement. Charles University, which he founded in Prague, was the first university in central Europe. During his 30-year reign the Czech lands did not experience the hardship of wars. The name was suggested by M. Juřík. || 
|-id=952
| 16952 Peteschultz ||  || Peter H. Schultz (born 1944), an American geologist at Brown University, has studied cratering phenomena experimentally and in the field. He has played a major role in defining and developing the Deep Impact mission, particularly through his cratering experiments at the NASA Ames Vertical Gun Range. || 
|-id=953
| 16953 Besicovitch ||  || Abram Samoilovitch Besicovitch (1891–1970), a Russian mathematician who taught at various institutions in the Soviet Union and later at the University of Cambridge. He had an astounding geometric intuition and proved many counter-intuitive results, particularly with regard to sets of points of fractal dimension. || 
|-id=958
| 16958 Klaasen || 1998 PF || Kenneth P. Klaasen (born 1946), a geomorphologist and expert in scientific operations of spacecraft at the Jet Propulsion Laboratory, has designed observational sequences for numerous planetary missions, most recently for Deep Impact, for which he has also overseen instrument calibration. || 
|-id=962
| 16962 Elizawoolard ||  || Elizabeth Woolard, 2003 Intel STS mentor. She teaches at the William G. Enloe High School, Raleigh, North Carolina. || 
|-id=967
| 16967 Marcosbosso ||  || Marcos Federico Bosso (born 1987), 2003 Intel STS winner. At the time, he attended the I.P.E.M. No 80, Dr. Luis Federico Leloir, Berrotaran, Cordoba, Argentina. || 
|-id=969
| 16969 Helamuda ||  || Hessisches Landesmuseum Darmstadt (Helamuda), the museum of the federal state of Hessen. This unique institution features exquisite collections in both fine arts and natural sciences and conducts paleontological excavations at the nearby Messel site. || 
|-id=972
| 16972 Neish ||  || Catherine D. Neish (born 1981) is a professor at the University of Western Ontario who studies Titan, the Moon and Venus using orbital radar. Previously known by the moniker Katie Dot, she is an avid scuba diver, a champion for social justice, and mother to Penelope. || 
|-id=973
| 16973 Gaspari ||  || Luciano Gaspari (born 1986), 2003 Intel STS winner. He attended the I.P.E.M. No 80, Dr. Luis Federico Leloir, Berrotaran, Cordoba, Argentina. || 
|-id=974
| 16974 Iphthime ||  || Iphthime from Greek mythology. She was Penelope's sister who appears to her in a dream and comforts her as she is grieving. || 
|-id=975
| 16975 Delamere ||  || W. Alan Delamere (born 1935), am American astronomer who recently retired from Ball Aerospace & Technologies, has made major contributions to cometary science, ranging from management of the Halley multicolor camera on the Giotto mission to his insightful approach to the original design of the Deep Impact mission and HiRISE. || 
|-id=982
| 16982 Tsinghua ||  || Tsinghua University is one of the most renowned research universities in China founded in 1911. It has made significant contributions to the development of science, technology, culture and the economy of China || 
|-id=984
| 16984 Veillet ||  || Christian Veillet (born 1954), a French astronomer and discoverer of minor planets was for several years head of the lunar-ranging station at the Côte d'Azur Observatory. Now senior astronomer for the Canada–France–Hawaii Telescope, he is project scientist for the megaprime project. He recently discovered that the trans-Neptunian object  is a binary. || 
|-id=986
| 16986 Archivestef ||  || Stephanie McLaughlin (born 1961), an American space scientist who has worked at the University of Maryland both for the Small Bodies Node of the Planetary Data System and for the Deep Impact project, contributing to ground testing of scientific instruments and preparation of the complete scientific archive. || 
|-id=996
| 16996 Dahir ||  || Roberto Daniel Dahir (born 1985), 2003 Intel STS finalist. He attended the E.P.E.T. No 6, Realico, La Pampa, Argentina. || 
|-id=997
| 16997 Garrone ||  || Nestor Juan Garrone (born 1984), 2003 Intel STS finalist. He attended the E.P.E.T. No 6, Realico, La Pampa, Argentina. || 
|-id=998
| 16998 Estelleweber ||  || Estelle Lela Weber (born 1986), 2003 Intel STS finalist. She attended the Wollumbin High School, Murwillumbah, Queensland, Australia. || 
|-id=999
| 16999 Ajstewart ||  || Andrew James Stewart (born 1987), 2003 Intel STS finalist. He attended the Karabar Distance Education Centre, Queanbeyan, NSW, Australia. || 
|-id=000
| 17000 Medvedev ||  || Alexandr V. Medvedev (born 1985), 2003 Intel STS and Karl Menger Memorial Prize finalist. He attended the BSU Liceum, Minsk, Belarus. || 
|}

References 

016001-017000